Float Away With the Friday Night Gods (FAWTFNG) is an album by the band Marah, released in 2002.
The Bielanko Brothers were joined by Jamie Mahon and Jon Kois of The Three 4 Tens.

In 2005, the band released the demos of the FAWTFNG sessions on its PHIdelity label.

Track listing 
"Float Away" – 5:35
"Soul" – 2:14
"Revolution" – 5:21
"People of the Underground" – 4:33
"Crying on an Airplane" – 5:02
"Leaving" – 4:20
"Shame" – 4:38
"For All We Know We're Dreaming" – 5:28
"What 2 Bring" – 4:26
"Out in Style" – 6:22

Personnel
Dave Bielanko - Guitar, Vocals
Serge Bielanko - Guitar, Vocals
Jamie Mahon - Bass Guitar, Vocals
Jon Kois - Drums, Percussion
Bruce Springsteen - Lead Guitar and Background Vocals on "Float Away"

References

 

2002 albums
Marah (band) albums
Artemis Records albums